Chiral oligoethylene glycols are oligoethylene glycols that have BINOL-based chiral backbones. These compounds are used in asymmetric catalysis as multifunctional chiral cation-binding catalysts. These compounds are also known as chiral anion generators.

References 

Dimers (chemistry)
Naphthols
Polyethers